The surilis are a group of Old World monkeys in the genus Presbytis. They live in the Thai-Malay Peninsula, on Sumatra, Borneo, Java and smaller nearby islands.  Besides surili, the common names for the monkeys in the genus also often use the terms "langur" or "leaf monkey."

Description
Surilis are rather small, slimly built primates. Their fur at the top is brown, grey, black, or orange, and at the lower surface whitish or greyish, sometimes also orange, with some species having fur designs at the head or at the hips. Their German name of Mützenlanguren ("capped langurs") comes from the hair on their head, which forms a tuft. They differ from the other langurs by characteristics in the shape of their head (particularly the poorly developed or absent brow ridges, and the prominent nasal bones), in the teeth, and by the size of their small thumbs. Surilis range in adult length from 40 to 60 cm (with a 50- to 85-cm-long tail) and a weight of 5 to 8 kg.

Behaviour
Diurnal forest dwellers, they spend nearly their entire lives in the trees. They live in groups of up to 21 animals (typically 10 or fewer animals in most species) consisting of a male, several females, and their young. A few species have been observed in monogamous pairings (particularly the Mentawai langur), although this might be a reaction to the decrease of their habitat. Lone males and all-male groups have also been reported. The groups are hierarchically developed, with intergroup communication that is both vocal and postural.

Diet
The surilis' diet consists of leaves, fruits, and seeds.

Breeding
Gestation time is 5–6 months, and births are typically of single young. Newborn animals are white colored and have a black strip at the back, although some have a cross-shaped mark. By one year old, the young are weaned and at an age of 4–5 years, they are fully mature. The typical life expectancy in the wild remains poorly known for most species, but captive Sumatran surilis have lived more than 18 years.

Conservation
Several species in this genus are restricted to regions with extensive habitat destruction, and are also threatened by hunting. Consequently, eight of the 11 species are rated as vulnerable or worse by IUCN, and the Sarawak surili has been referred to as "one of the rarest primates in the world." Recently, a subspecies of Hose's langur called Miller's grizzled langur, thought to be extinct, was rediscovered in the Wehea Forest on the eastern tip of Borneo island, though it remains one of the world's most endangered primates.

Taxonomy
Two other genera, Trachypithecus and Semnopithecus, were formerly considered subgenera of Presbytis. The species-level taxonomy of Presbytis is complex, and significant changes have been proposed for several in recent years.

 Genus Presbytis 
 Black-crested Sumatran langur, Presbytis melalophos
 Black-and-white langur Presbytis bicolor
 Black Sumatran langur Presbytis sumatrana
 Mitered langur Presbytis mitrata
 Raffles' banded langur, Presbytis femoralis
 Robinson's banded langur, Presbytis robinsoni
 East Sumatran banded langur, Presbytis percura
 Sarawak surili, Presbytis chrysomelas
 Bornean banded surili, Presbytis chrysomelas chrysomelas
 Tricolored surili, Presbytis chrysomelas cruciger
 White-thighed surili, Presbytis siamensis
 Malayan white-thighed surili, Presbytis siamensis siamensis
 Presbytis siamensis rhionis
 Presbytis siamensis cana
 Presbytis siamensis paenulata
 White-fronted surili, Presbytis frontata
 Javan surili, Presbytis comata 
 Grizzled leaf monkey, Presbytis comata comata 
 Javan fuscous langur, Presbytis comata fredericae
 Thomas's langur, Presbytis thomasi
 Hose's langur, Presbytis hosei
 Hose's grizzled langur, Presbytis hosei hosei
 Everett's grizzled langur, Presbytis hosei everetti
 Saban grizzled langur, Presbytis sabana
 Miller's langur, Presbytis canicrus
 Maroon leaf monkey, Presbytis rubicunda
 Muller's maroon langur, Presbytis rubicunda rubicunda
 Presbytis rubicunda rubida
 Presbytis rubicunda ignita
 Davis's maroon langur, Presbytis rubicunda chrysea
 Karimata Island maroon langur, Presbytis rubicunda carimatae
 Mentawai langur or joja, Presbytis potenziani
 Siberut langur, Presbytis siberu
 Natuna Island surili, Presbytis natunae

References

External links

 Primate Info Net Presbytis Factsheets

 
Taxa named by Johann Friedrich von Eschscholtz